A raster graphics editor is a computer program that allows users to create and edit images  interactively on the computer screen and save them in one of many raster graphics file formats (also known as bitmap images) such as JPEG, PNG, and GIF.

Comparison to vector graphic editors 
Vector graphics editors are often contrasted with raster graphics editors, yet their capabilities complement each other. The technical difference between vector and raster editors stem from the difference between vector and raster images. Vector graphics are created mathematically, using geometric formulas. Each element is created and manipulated numerically; essentially using Cartesian coordinates for the placement of key points, and then a mathematical algorithm to connect the dots and define the colors.

Raster images include digital photos. A raster image is made up of rows and columns of dots, called pixels, and is generally more photo-realistic. This is the standard form for digital cameras; whether it be a .raw file or .jpg file, the concept is the same. The image is represented pixel by pixel, like a microscopic jigsaw puzzle.

Vector editors tend to be better suited for graphic design, page layout, typography, logos, sharp-edged artistic illustrations, e.g., cartoons, clip art, complex geometric patterns, technical illustrations, diagramming and flowcharting.

Advanced raster editors, like GIMP and Adobe Photoshop, use vector methods (mathematics) for general layout and elements such as text, but are equipped to deal with raster images down to the pixel and often have special capabilities in doing so, such as brightness/contrast, and even adding "lighting" to a raster image or photograph.

Common features 
 Select a region for editing
 Draw lines with simulated brushes of different color, size, shape and pressure
 Fill a region with a single color, gradient of colors, or a texture
 Select a color using different color models, e.g., RGB, HSV, or by using a color dropper
 Edit and convert between various color models.
 Add typed letters in various font styles
 Remove imperfections from photo images
 Composite editing using layers
 Apply filters for effects including sharpening and blurring
 Convert between various image file formats

See also 
 Comparison of raster graphics editors
 Vector graphics editor
 Texture map
 Text editor
 3D modelling software

External links